Misiliscemi is a comune in Sicily, Italy, administratively part of the province of Trapani. It borders the municipalities of Marsala, Paceco and Trapani.

It was formed in 2021 as result of the 2018 referendum, in which the inhabitants of the eight frazioni of Trapani voted for the formation of Misiliscemi, with 3,752 votes in favor out of 7,530 voters.

References 

Municipalities of the Province of Trapani